From the Middle Ages until the advent of the skyscraper, Christian church buildings were often the tallest buildings in the United Kingdom. Indeed, it was not until the building of the BT Tower in London in 1962 that St Paul's Cathedral was no longer the city's tallest structure.

The United Kingdom no longer features as prominently on the list of tallest churches worldwide, but in 1311, Lincoln Cathedral surpassed the Great Pyramid of Giza  to become the world's tallest building. Salisbury Cathedral is the present tallest church building in the country, standing at a height of 123 metres (404 feet), and it remains amongst the tallest medieval churches in the world.

Extant churches 
Note: This list does not include church buildings which have been reduced in height, either through rebuilding or damage due to disaster. These buildings are incorporated into the list of tallest churches buildings. The height referred to in the table includes weathervanes etc on spires and pinnacles. Actual architectural height may be lower.

Churches 200 feet or taller

References 

Tallest